Kurupam is a village in Parvathipuram Manyam district of the Indian state of Andhra Pradesh.

Geography
It has an average altitude of 133 meters (439 feet).

Demography
 census, Kurupam mandal had a population of 46,439. Males consists of 23,241 and females 23,198 of the population. The average literacy rate is 46%, below the national average of 59.5%. Male literacy rate is 57% and that of females is 35%. Way back the great people such as Ravupalli Krishna Murthy was born here and contributed so much to this Mandal. This legacy is carrying by Ravupalli Umamaheswararao, Ravupalli Srinivasa Hemanth and Divya Ravupalli

Kurupam Kingdom
Vyricherla Kishore Chandra Suryanarayana Deo, Erstwhile Zamindar - Rajah of Kurupam and Tribal Chiefs of the Konda Dora Tribe  was member of Lok Sabha and a Union Cabinet Minister. He is now a senior member of the Telugu Desam Party.

References 

Villages in Parvathipuram Manyam district